Filadélfia is a municipality in the state of Bahia in the North-East region of Brazil. It has a population of 16,345 . It was raised to municipality status in 1985, the area being taken out of the municipality of Pindobaçu.

See also
List of municipalities in Bahia

References

Municipalities in Bahia